File sharing is a method of distributing electronically stored information such as computer programs and digital media. Below is a list of file sharing applications, most of them make use of peer-to-peer file sharing technologies.

This comparison contains also download managers that can be used as file sharing applications. For pure download managers see the comparison of download managers, and for BitTorrent-only clients the comparison of BitTorrent clients.

Table 

 Note that several applications had adware or spyware tied in during the past and may have it again in the future. The same goes for forks of open source apps, e.g. eMule. This list attempts to display the current status only.
 No longer available from their websites: Acquisition, Audiogalaxy, Bearshare, Bitblinder, CuteMX, edonkey2000, Grokster, iMesh, Kazaa, Kazaa Lite, LimeWire, Manolito, Morpheus, Napster, Pando and Scour Exchange
 Opera web browser no longer includes P2P functionality.

See also

Other comparisons

Notes 

File sharing applications
File sharing software